Kisoga has several meanings, including:

 Kisoga, Mukono, a town located in Mukono District, Central Uganda
 Kisoga, Gomba, a settlement located in Gomba District, Uganda
 In the Lusoga language, anything related to Busoga.